Mark Yevgenyevich Tkachuk (born 26 September 1966) is a Moldovan politician, historian, archaeologist and anthropologist, former member of the Parliament of the Republic of Moldova.

Biography
He was born in 1966, in Soroca, Moldavian SSR. His father Yevgeny is of Moldovan-Ukrainian origin and his mother Azniv, originating in the Caucasus, of Armenian-Hemshin origin. He graduated from the History Faculty at the State University of Moldova. From 1992 to 1994 he studied at the Academy of Sciences of Russia. According to some sources, during this period he was part of the far-left Confederation of Anarcho-Syndicalists.

At the beginning of 2000 he joined the Party of Communists of the Republic of Moldova. In 2001-2002 he was a Member of the Parliament of the Republic of Moldova, giving up his mandate to become adviser to President Vladimir Voronin in domestic policy, a position he had held until November 2008. During this period he became one of the leaders of the Communist Party, working on the modernization of the party. He is believed to have negotiated the accession of the PCRM to the Party of the European Left. The opposition criticized him for his strong pro-Russian, Moldovenist, anti-European and anti-Romanian position, characterizing him as "Moscow's right hand man".

In 2005 and 2006, VIP Magazine included mark Tkaciuk in the top "most influential Moldovans" at 11 and 6, respectively.

After 2009, when the PCRM entered the opposition, Mark Tkaciuk started to support more strongly a party reform. He started to be labelled as the "brain" or the "grey eminence" of the party, as well as "Voronin's child". Together with Voronin, he became a vocal critic of the European Union, supporting the accession of Moldova to the Eurasian Union, stating that Chișinău had streets named after fascist criminals (referring to the streets named by Romanian personalities). In early 2010 he was also associated with the Antifa movement in Moldova, known for quasi-terrorist activities, which is why in 2014 he was excluded from the executive committee of PCRM. In the same year he announced he was withdrawing from politics.

He returned to politics in 2019 when, together with Iurie Muntean, he founded the Collective Action Party – Civic Congress. He is currently a member of the executive committee of the party.

References

People from Soroca
Moldovan communists
Members of the parliament of Moldova
Recipients of the Order of Honour (Moldova)
Party of Communists of the Republic of Moldova politicians
20th-century Moldovan historians
Moldovan archaeologists
Moldovan people of Ukrainian descent
Moldovan people of Armenian descent
Moldova State University alumni
Anti-fascists
1966 births
Living people